Mount Fulton is a mountain,  high, between Mount Passel and Mount Gilmour in the Denfeld Mountains of the Ford Ranges in Marie Byrd Land, Antarctica. It was mapped by the United States Antarctic Service (1939–41) led by Rear Admiral Richard E. Byrd, and was named for R. Arthur Fulton who was of great assistance in arranging the insurance for the Jacob Ruppert, one of the ships used by the Byrd Antarctic Expedition (1933–35).

References

Mountains of Marie Byrd Land